The  Casa de las Conchas is a historical building in Salamanca, central Spain. It currently houses a public library.

It was built from 1493 to 1517 by Rodrigo Arias de Maldonado, a knight of the Order of Santiago de Compostela and a professor in the University of Salamanca. Its most peculiar feature is the façade, mixing late Gothic and Plateresque style, decorated with more than 300 shells,  symbol of the order of Santiago, as well as of the pilgrims performing the Way of St. James. In the façade are also the coat of arms of the Catholic Monarchs and four windows in Gothic style, each one having a different shape. The entrance portal has the coat of arms of the Maldonado family, while in the architrave are dolphins, a Renaissance symbol of love, and vegetable elements. 

The inner court is characterized, in the lower floor, by arches supported by square pilasters, while in the upper ones they are supported by shorter columns in Carrara marble.

Sources

This article is based on the entry in the Enciclopedia Libre Universal, released under the CC-BY-SA license.

Buildings and structures in Salamanca
Houses completed in 1517
Gothic architecture in Castile and León
Libraries in Spain
1517 establishments in Spain